Sheikh Bahaei University (SHBU), was established by virtue of the 1994 law of non-governmental and non-profitable universities and institutions through the efforts of ten professors from the University of Isfahan.

Sheikh Bahaei University is governed according to educational regulations of the High Council of Cultural Revolution and the Ministry of Science, Research and Technology, the latter endorsing its credential degrees. Like many other universities and institutes affiliated with the Ministry, it admits students through the National Entrance Examination held by the Iranian Educational Testing Organization. The students are therefore expected to comply with the rules and regulations set by the mentioned Council and Ministry in all aspects of their education including matters related to student affairs, discipline, tuition and fees.

Founders of the University 
  Dr. Ali Danaei
 Dr. Mostafa Emadzadeh
  Dr. S. Mohammad Hassan Feiz
 Dr. Nasser Ghasem-Aghaee
 Dr. Mehdi Jamshidian
 Dr. S. Mahmood Khatoon Abaadi
 Dr. Ali Akbar Mohammadi
 Eng. Mahmood Roughani
 Dr. Mohammad Hassan Tahririan
 Dr. Jafar Zafarani

See also
Baha' ad-Din al-`Amili, after whom the University was named
Higher education in Iran
Science in Iran

References

External links
Official Website

1994 establishments in Iran
Universities in Iran
Educational institutions established in 1994
Universities in Isfahan Province